Han, known as the Later Han in historiography, was a short-lived imperial dynasty of China that existed from 947 to 951. It was the fourth of the Five Dynasties during the Five Dynasties and Ten Kingdoms period in Chinese history, and the third consecutive Shatuo-led Chinese dynasty, although other sources indicate that the Later Han emperors claimed patrilineal Han ancestry. It was among the shortest-lived of all Chinese regimes, lasting for slightly under four years before it was overthrown by a rebellion that resulted in the founding of the Later Zhou dynasty. Remnants of the Later Han then founded the Northern Han dynasty.

Establishment of the Later Han

Liu Zhiyuan was military governor of Bingzhou, an area around Taiyuan in present-day Shanxi that had long been a stronghold of the sinicized Shatuo.  However, the Later Jin he served was weak and little more than a puppet of the expanding Khitan empire to the north.  When the Later Jin finally did decide to defy them, the Khitan sent an expedition south that resulted in the destruction of the Later Jin.

The Khitan force made it all the way to the Yellow River before the emperor decided to return to his base in present-day Beijing, in the heart of the contentious Sixteen Prefectures.  However, following constant harassment from the Chinese on the return route, he died of an illness in May 947.  The combination of the fall of the Later Jin and the succession crisis among the Khitan resulted in a power vacuum.  Liu Zhiyuan was able to fill that void and founded the Later Han.

Sources conflict as to the origin of the Later Han and Northern Han Emperors, some indicate Shatuo ancestry while another claims that the Emperors claimed patrilineal Han Chinese ancestry.

Territorial extent

Liu Zhiyuan established his capital at Bian, present day Kaifeng.  The Later Han held essentially the same territory as the Later Jin.  Its southern border with the southern states stretched from the East China Sea about halfway between the Yellow River and the Yangtze River before dipping south toward the Yangtze at its mid reaches before turning northwest along the northern border of Sichuan and extending as far west as Shaanxi.  In the north, it included much of Shaanxi and Hebei except the Sixteen Prefectures, which were lost by the Later Jin to what was by this time known as the Liao Dynasty.

Short-lived dynasty

The Later Han was among the shortest-lived regimes in the long history of China.  Liu Zhiyuan died the year following the founding of the dynasty, to be succeeded by his teenaged son.  The dynasty was overthrown two years later when a Han Chinese named Guo Wei led a military coup and declared himself emperor of the Later Zhou.

Northern Han

The remnants of the Later Han returned to the traditional Shatuo stronghold of Shanxi and established the Northern Han kingdom, sometimes referred to as the Eastern Han.  Under Liao dynasty protection, it was able to remain independent of the Later Zhou.  The Song Dynasty emerged from the ashes of the Later Zhou in 960 and emerged as a strong, stabilizing presence in northern China.  Though they had been successful in bringing the southern states under its control, a process essentially completed in 978, the Northern Han were able to hold out due to help from the Liao Dynasty.  In fact, the continued existence of the Northern Han was one of the two thorns in the side of Liao-Song relations.  Finally, the Song Dynasty was able to incorporate the Northern Han into its territory in 979, essentially completing the reunification of China, with the exception of the Sixteen Prefectures, which would remain in the hands of the Liao dynasty.

Rulers

Later Han and Northern Han emperors family tree

References

Citations

Sources 

 

 
Five Dynasties and Ten Kingdoms
Dynasties in Chinese history
Former countries in Chinese history
940s establishments
10th-century establishments in China
950s disestablishments
10th-century disestablishments in China
States and territories disestablished in the 950s
Turkic dynasties
Former monarchies